Pedro Orlando Castellano Arrieta (born March 11, 1970), is a Venezuelan former Major League Baseball third baseman/first baseman and right-handed batter who played for the Colorado Rockies (1993, 1995–1996). He also played one season in Japan for the Yomiuri Giants in 1997.

Castellano was a career .161 hitter (15-for-93) with three home runs, nine RBI, 13 runs, two doubles and one stolen base in 51 games. Castellano played for the Tecolotes de Nuevo Laredo of the Mexican League in 2010.

See also
 List of Major League Baseball players from Venezuela

External links

Retrosheet
Mexican League statistics
Venezuelan League statistics

1970 births
Águilas del Zulia players
Charlotte Knights players
Colorado Rockies players
Colorado Springs Sky Sox players
Diablos Rojos del México players
Guerreros de Oaxaca players
Iowa Cubs players
Leones de Yucatán players
Living people
Major League Baseball players from Venezuela
Major League Baseball third basemen
Mexican League baseball first basemen
Mexican League baseball third basemen
Nippon Professional Baseball second basemen
Nippon Professional Baseball shortstops
Nippon Professional Baseball third basemen
People from Lara (state)
Peoria Chiefs players
Piratas de Campeche players
Rojos del Águila de Veracruz players
Salt Lake Buzz players
SSG Landers players
Tecolotes de Nuevo Laredo players
Tigres de Aragua players
Tigres de Quintana Roo players
Venezuelan expatriate baseball players in Japan
Venezuelan expatriate baseball players in Mexico
Venezuelan expatriate baseball players in South Korea
Venezuelan expatriate baseball players in the United States
Winston-Salem Spirits players
Wytheville Cubs players
Yomiuri Giants players